Marc Trilles Gil (born 8 August 1991 in Vilafamés, Plana Alta, Valencian Community) is a Spanish footballer who plays for Gimnàstic de Tarragona as a central defender.

External links

1991 births
Living people
People from Plana Alta
Sportspeople from the Province of Castellón
Spanish footballers
Footballers from the Valencian Community
Association football defenders
Segunda División players
Segunda División B players
Tercera División players
CD Castellón footballers
Atlético Saguntino players
Lleida Esportiu footballers
Gimnàstic de Tarragona footballers